Shoemaker's House was constructed in the 1870s, in what is now Toodyay, Western Australia on Stirling Terrace.

Shoemaker's House is a unique building having two shops linked by a dwelling that is slightly set back. This was one of Daniel Connor's first commercial developments in the region and he intended to lease it from the beginning. It was later owned by Charles Ellery.

References 

Buildings and structures in Toodyay, Western Australia
Stirling Terrace, Toodyay
Heritage places in Toodyay, Western Australia